Elizabeth Renner (died 1826) was an African missionary teacher.

Elizabeth Renner was a Nova Scotia Settler. She emigrated from Nova Scotia to Freetown, Sierra Leone, in 1792.

In 1804, she became the housekeeper of the Melchior Renner of Württemberg, who was one of the first three missionaries sent to Africa and Freetown by the British Anglican Church Mission Society (CMS) that same year. In 1808, she married Melchior Renner.

She managed the missionary Bashia School for girls in 1808–1818. She was the first female teacher and principal of a girls' school in the missionary in Africa. Her school had many students from the elite Euro-African families of the region. One of her students were Elizabeth Frazer Skelton.

References

1826 deaths
 Sierra Leone Creole people
18th-century African-American people
18th-century American slaves
18th-century Sierra Leonean people
19th-century educators
19th-century Sierra Leonean people
19th-century women educators
Nova Scotian Settlers